The Georgia Department of Corrections operates prisons, transitional centers, probation detention centers, and substance use disorder treatment facilities. In addition, state inmates are also housed at private and county correctional facilities.



State prisons

Transitional centers

Reentry facilities

Probation facilities

Substance use disorder facilities

Private facilities

County facilities

Closed facilities (partial list)

Notes  
Listed are the physical capacities, not the operational capacities. Because facilities may house a greater number of offenders than their established operational capacities, and because operational capacities are much more likely to change than vice versa, physical capacities may be more useful numbers for comparison purposes.
The Georgia Department of Corrections only houses juveniles sentenced as adults. All others are housed in facilities operated by the Georgia Department of Juvenile Justice.

References

Works cited

External links
 Facilities Division, Georgia Department of Corrections

 
Georgia Department of Corrections facilities
Prisons